Östavall is a locality situated in Ånge Municipality, Västernorrland County, Sweden with 222 inhabitants in 2010.

Sports
The following sports clubs are located in Östavall:

 Östavalls IF

References 

Populated places in Ånge Municipality
Medelpad